Ranin Akua (born 1961/62) is a former Member of Parliament of Nauru, from the constituency of Ubenide.

Having been unseated in the 2019 Parliamentary election, Akua stood unsuccessfully to regain his Ubenide seat in 2022.

References

Living people
1960s births
Members of the Parliament of Nauru
21st-century Nauruan politicians